Metaneira was a hetaira active in Classical Corinth and Athens.  As a child, she was purchased by Nikarete of Corinth.   She was raised as a daughter, along with Neaera, and molded into a hetaera. Athenaeus claims that she was the mistress of both Isocrates and Lysias, who according to Apollodorus arranged for her to be initiated into the Mysteries of Eleusis.

References

4th-century BC Greek people
Hetairai
Greek female prostitutes
4th-century BC Greek women
Ancient Greek slaves and freedmen